A television licence or broadcast receiving licence is a permit required in many countries for the reception of television broadcasts or the possession of a television set. In some countries a licence is also required to own a radio or receive radio broadcasts. In such countries, some broadcasts are funded in full or in part by the licence fees.  Licence fees are effectively a hypothecated tax to fund public broadcasting.

History

Radio broadcasters in the early Twentieth Century needed to raise funds for their services. In some countries this was achieved via advertising, while others adopted a compulsory subscription model with households that owned a radio set being required to purchase a licence. The United Kingdom was the first country to adopt compulsory public subscription with a licence, originally known as a wireless licence, used to fund the BBC. In most countries that introduced radio licensing, possession of a licence was simply an indication of having paid the fee. However in Canada, between 1914 and 1922 people needed to pass an "Amateur Experimental Certificate of Proficiency", demonstrating the ability to send and receive Morse code at five words per minute, to be allowed to use a radio receiver. 

With the arrival of television, some countries created separate television licences. Other countries increased radio licence fees to cover the additional cost of television broadcasting, changing the name from "radio licence" to "TV licence" or "receiver licence". Today, most countries fund public radio broadcasting from the same licence fee that is used for television, although a few still have separate radio licences. Some countries, such as the United Kingdom and Japan, have lower fees for households that only own monochrome televisions sets. In many countries, elderly and disabled consumers have a reduced or zero licence fee.

Faced with licence fee evasion, some countries chose to fund public broadcasters directly from taxation or via methods such as a co-payment with electricity billing. In some countries, national public broadcasters carry advertising.

In 1989, the Council of Europe created the European Convention on Transfrontier Television.  Among other things, this regulates advertising. The treaty came into force in 1993 when it had been ratified by seven countries, including five EU member states. , 34 countries have acceded to the treaty.

Television licensing by country

Usage and costs of television licences vary greatly between countries. The Museum of Broadcast Communications in Chicago reports that two-thirds of countries in Europe and half of countries in Asia and Africa use television licences to fund public television. Television licensing is rare in the Americas, largely confined to French overseas departments and British Overseas Territories. In some countries, radio channels and broadcasters' websites are also funded by a licence, giving access to radio and online services free of advertising.

Television licences in Europe

Albania
The Albanian licence fee is 100 lekë per month, paid as part of the electricity bill. This makes up part of RTSH's funding: 58% comes directly from the government through taxes with the remainder from commercials and the licence fee.

Austria
Under Austria's TV and Radio Licence Law (Fernseh- und Hörfunklizenzrecht), all operational broadcast reception equipment must be registered. The Gebühren Info Service is responsible for licence administration. It is a fully-owned subsidiary of the Austrian public broadcaster, (ORF) and an agency of the Federal Ministry of Finance. GIS's aim is to inform people about licensing, using a four-channel communication strategy consisting of:
 advertising campaigns in printed media, radio and television,
 direct mail,
 outlets such as post offices, banks, tobacconsists and the five GIS Service Centers where people can register,
 field service customer consultants visiting households not yet registered.

In 2007 the total licensing income was €682 million, 66% of was allocated to the ORF. The remaining 34% was allocated to federal government and local governments to fund cultural activities. GIS employs 191 people and has approximately 125 freelancers in the field service. 3.4 million Austrian households are registered with the GIS with 2.5% evading the licence.

The television & radio licence fee varies between states. As of 2022, Styria has the highest annual television licence cost, at €343.80, and Salzburg and Burgenland has the highest annual radio licence cost, at €94.92. Annual fees from July 2022 are:

Bosnia and Herzegovina 
The licence fee in Bosnia and Herzegovina is approximately €46 per year. The Bosnian War and associated collapse of infrastructure caused very high evasion rates. This has partly been resolved by collecting the licence fee as part of each household's monthly telephone bill. The licence fee is divided between three broadcasters:
 50% to BHRT (Radio and Television of Bosnia and Herzegovina), the main  radio and television broadcaster in Bosnia and Herzegovina at national level, and Bosnia's only member of the European Broadcasting Union.
 25% to RTVFBiH (Radio-Television of the Federation of Bosnia and Herzegovina), a radio and television broadcaster that primarily serves the Federation of Bosnia and Herzegovina.
 25% to RTRS (Radio-Television of the Republika Srpska), a radio and television broadcaster which primarily serves the Republika Srpska.

Croatia
The licence fee in Croatia is regulated by the Croatian Radiotelevision Act, 2003. This law was written to ensure compliance with the European Convention on Transfrontier Television, which Croatia joined between 1999 and 2002. In addition to the licensing, the law regulates television advertising. Up to 9% of air time on HRT may be given to advertising, with a limit of only one commercial during short breaks and no breaks during films. This is less than the limit permitted for commercial broadcasters. 

The licence fee is charged to all owners of equipment capable of receiving television or radio broadcasts. It is set at 1.5% of the previous year's average net salary, which is €137 per year per household with at least one radio or television receiver. It is the main source of revenue for the national broadcaster Hrvatska Radiotelevizija (HRT), and a secondary source of income for other national and local broadcasters, which receive a minority share. Within HRT, 66% of the licence fee income goes to television and 34% to radio.

Czech Republic
The licence fee in the Czech Republic is 135 Kč per month for television and 45 Kč per month for radio, amounting to 2160 Kč per year. Paid advertisements are not permitted on television except in narrowly defined circumstances during a transitional period. Each household that owns at least one television pays for one licence, regardless of how many televisions they own. Corporations and the self-employed must pay for a licence for each television and radio.

Germany
The licence fee in Germany is €18.36 per month (€220 per annum) for all apartments, secondary residences, holiday homes and summer houses. Since 2003 it is payable regardless of possession or use of television and radio. Businesses and institutions must pay, based on factors including numbers of employees, vehicles and, for hotels, beds. The fee is billed monthly but typically paid quarterly or yearly. It is collected by Beitragsservice von ARD, ZDF und Deutschlandradio which is sometimes criticized for its enforcement measures. Since 2013, only recipients of a certain social benefits such as Arbeitslosengeld II or student loans and grants are exempt from the licence fee. People with certain disabilities can apply to pay a reduced fee of €5.83. Low income in general is no longer a reason for exemption. Since the fee is billed to a person and not to a dwelling, empty dwellings are exempt.

The licence fee is used to fund the public broadcasters ZDF and Deutschlandradio, as well as the nine regional broadcasters of the ARD network. Together, they run 22 television channels (10 regional, 10 national, 2 international: Arte and 3sat) and 61 radio stations (58 regional, 3 national). Two national television stations and 32 regional radio stations carry limited advertising. The 14 regional regulatory authorities for private broadcasters are also funded by the licence fee, and in some states, non-profit community radio stations get small amounts of the licence fee. Germany's international broadcaster, Deutsche Welle, is fully funded by the German federal government, though much of its new content is provided by the ARD.

Germany's per capita budget for public broadcasting is close to the European average but the total is one of the largest in the world. In 2006, annual income from licence fees was more than €7.9 billion.

The board of public broadcasters sued the German states for interference with their budgeting process, and on 11 September 2007, the Supreme Court decided in their favour. This effectively rendered the public broadcasters independent and self-governing.
Public broadcasters have announced that they are determined to use all available ways to reach their "customers" and as such have started a very broad Internet presence with media portals, news and TV programs. National broadcasters abandoned an earlier pledge to restrict their online activities. This resulted in newspapers taking court action against the ARD, claiming that its Tagessschau smartphone app was unfairly subsidised by the licence fee, to the detriment of free-market providers of news content apps. The case was dismissed with the court advising the two sides to find a compromise.

Greece
The licence fee in Greece is paid through electricity bills. It is charged to every electricity account, including private residences and businesses. There has been discussion of replacing it with a direct licence fee after complaints from people who do not own a television set. An often-quoted joke is that even the dead pay the licence fee, since graveyards have electricity bills.

Licensing income is paid to the state broadcaster, Ellinikí Radiofonía Tileórasi (ERT). In June 2013, ERT was closed down to save money for the Greek government and licence fees were temporarily suspended.
In June 2015, ERT reopened and the licence fee resumed at a rate of €36 per year.

Ireland

As of 2020, the cost of a television licence in Ireland is €160. The licence applies to premises so a separate licence is required for holiday homes or motor vehicles which contain a television. The licence must be paid for premises that have any equipment that can potentially decode TV signals, regardless of whether they view RTÉ's content. The licence is free to anyone over the age of 70, to some people over 66, and people who are blind (these licences are paid for by the state). The Irish post office, An Post, is responsible for the collection of the licence fee and commencement of prosecution proceedings in cases of non-payment, but An Post has signalled its intention to withdraw from its licence fee business. The licence fee makes up 50% of the revenue of RTÉ, the national broadcaster with the rest coming from radio and television advertisements. Some RTÉ services have not historically relied on the licence for income, such as RTÉ 2fm, RTÉ Aertel, RTÉ.ie but since 2012 RTÉ 2FM has had some financial support from the licence. The RTÉ Transmission Network operates on an entirely commercial basis. 

5% of the licence fee goes to the Broadcasting Authority of Ireland's "Sound and Vision Scheme", which provides funds for programme production and restoration of archive material. From 2011 until 2018 5% of RTÉ's licence income was granted to TG4. RTÉ is now required to provide TG4 with programming. The remainder of TG4's funding is from direct state grants and commercial income.

Italy

The licence fee in Italy is charged to each household with a television set, regardless of use, and to all public premises with one or more televisions or radios. In 2016, the government reduced the licence fee to €100 per household and incorporated it into electricity bills in an attempt to eliminate evasion, and as of 2018, the fee was €90.00.

66% of RAI's income comes from the licence fee (up from about half of total income seven years ago), and 25% from advertising.

Montenegro

Under the Broadcasting Law of December 2002, each household and legal entity in Montenegro able to receive radio or television programmes is required to pay a broadcasting subscription fee. The monthly fee is €3.50, or €42.00 per annum.
Funds are distributed, 
 75% to the republic's public broadcasting radio and television services,
 10% to support local public broadcasting services
 10% to support commercial broadcasting services,
 5% to support the Broadcasting Agency of Montenegro.
The Broadcasting Agency of Montenegro collected the fee through telephone bills, but after the privatization of Telekom, the new owners, T-com, announced they would not administer the fee after July 2007.

Poland 
As of 2020, the licence fee in Poland for a television set is 22.70 zł per month, or for radio only is 7.00 zł per month. One licence is required per household, irrespective of the number of sets. The fee is waived for people over 75. Public health institutions, nurseries, educational institutions, hospices and retirement homes need only one licence per building or building complex they occupy. Commercial premises need a licence for each set, including radios and televisions in company vehicles. 

Around 60% of the fee goes to Telewizja Polska with the rest going to Polskie Radio. Advertisements are allowed between programmes on public television but it is not permitted to interrupt its programmes for advertisements. 

The licence is collected and maintained by the Polish post office, Poczta Polska. There is a major problem with licence evasion in Poland: in 2012 around 65% of households evaded the licence fee (compared to an average of 10% in the European Union), and in 2020, only 8% of Polish households paid the licence fee. Reasons for non-payment include the opt-in system in which there is no effective means to compel people to register or to prosecute those that fail to do so. Licensing inspectors, who are usually postal workers, do not have the right of entry to inspect premises and must get the owner's or occupier's permission to enter. Also, the public media are frequently accused of producing pro-government propaganda and not being independent public broadcasters. Due to widespread non-payment of the licence fee, in 2020 the government gave a 2 billion złoty grant for public media.

Portugal

From September 2003, the Rádio e Televisão de Portugal (RTP) was financed through government grants and the "Taxa de Contribuição Audiovisual" (Portuguese for Broadcasting Contribution Tax), charged monthly through the electricity bills.
Following the 2010–2014 Portuguese financial crisis, government grants ended and RTP was financed only through the "Taxa de Contribuição Audiovisual" and advertising. Since July 2016, the fee is €2.85 + VAT per month.

RTP1 can broadcast only 6 minutes of commercial advertising per hour (commercial channels can broadcast 12 minutes per hour). RTP2 and the public radios stations have no commercial advertising. RTP3 and RTP Memória can broadcast commercial advertising on cable, satellite and IPTV platforms but not on digital terrestrial television.

Serbia
Licence fees in Serbia are bundled together with electricity bills and collected monthly. There have been increasing indications that the Government of Serbia is considering the temporary cessation of the licence fee until a more effective financing solution is found. However, as of 28 August 2013 this has yet to be realized.

Slovenia
Since June 2013, the annual licence fee in Slovenia is €12.75 per household per month to receive both television and radio services, or €3.77 per month for radio only, regardless of the number of devices capable of receiving television or radio broadcasts. Businesses and the self-employed pay this amount for each set, and pay higher rates where they are intended for public viewing rather than private use by employees.

The licence fee is used to fund national broadcaster RTV Slovenija. In 2007, the licence fee raised €78.1 million, approximately 68% of the broadcaster's operating revenue. RTV Slovenija's advertising income in 2007 was €21.6 million.

Switzerland
Any household that receives radio or television programs from the Swiss national public broadcaster SRG SSR must be registered and pay licence fees. The fee is CHF 335 per year for TV and radio for single households, and CHF 670 for multiple households, e.g. nursing homes. Households unable to receive broadcast transmissions are exempt from the fees until 2023 if residents apply to opt out. Residential licence fees are collected by Serafe AG, a wholly-owned subsidiary of the insurance collections agency Secon. Non-payment of licence fees incurs fines of up to CHF 100,000. For businesses, the fee is on a scale based on the company's annual turnover and is collected by the Swiss Federal Tax Administration.
The majority of the fee, CHF 1.2 billion, goes to SRG SSR, with the rest going to a collection of small regional radio and television broadcasters. 

On 4 March 2018, there was a referendum on whether TV licensing should be scrapped, with the slogan "No Billag", a reference to the previous collector of the licence fees. Parliament have advocated a no vote. Voters overwhelmingly rejected the proposal by 71.6% to 28.4% and in all cantons. Following the vote, the fee was significantly reduced.

Turkey
A licence fee of up to 16% is paid to the state broadcaster TRT by the producer/importer of the television receiving equipment. Consumers indirectly pay this fee when purchasing equipment. No registration is required for television receiving equipment, except for cellular phones as mandated by a separate law. 

TRT also receives funding via advertisements. Previously a 2% tax was added to monthly electricity bills but this has been abolished.

United Kingdom

A television licence is required for each household where television programmes are watched or recorded as they are broadcast, irrespective of the signal method (terrestrial, satellite, cable or the Internet). As of September 2016, users of BBC iPlayer must also have a television licence to watch on-demand television content from the service. As of 1 April 2017, after a price freeze that began in 2010, the cost of a licence may now increase to account for inflation. As of January 2022, the licence fee is £159 for a colour and £53.50 for a black and white television Licence As it is classified in law as a tax, evasion of licence fees is a criminal offence. 204,018 people were prosecuted or fined in 2014 for TV licence offences: 173,044 in England, 12,536 in Wales, 4,905 people in Northern Ireland and 15 in the Isle of Man.

The licence fee is used almost entirely to fund BBC domestic radio, television and internet services. Money received from the licence represents approximately 75% of the cost of these services, with most of the remainder coming from the profits of BBC Studios, a commercial arm of the corporation which distributes content outside of the United Kingdom, and operates or licences BBC-branded television services and brands. The BBC also receives some funding from the Scottish Government via MG Alba to finance the BBC Alba Gaelic-language television service in Scotland. The BBC used to receive a direct government grant from the Foreign and Commonwealth Office to fund television and radio services broadcast to other countries, such as the BBC World Service radio and BBC Arabic Television. These services run on a non-profit, non-commercial basis. The grant was abolished on 1 April 2014, leaving these services to be funded by the UK licence fee, a move which has caused some controversy.

Channel 4 is also a public television service but it is funded through advertising. The Welsh language S4C is funded through a combination of a direct grant from the Department for Culture, Media and Sport and advertising, and receives some programming free of charge from the BBC. These other broadcasters are much smaller than the BBC. 

In addition to public broadcasters, the United Kingdom has a wide range of commercial television funded by advertising and subscription. A television licence is still required of viewers who solely watch such commercial channels, although 74.9% of the population watches BBC One in any given week, making it the most popular channel in the country. A similar licence existed for radio but was abolished in 1971.

Television licences in Africa

Ghana 
The licence fee in Ghana was reintroduced in 2015, and is used to fund the Ghana Broadcasting Corporation (GBC). Households have to pay between GH¢36 and GH¢60 per year for using one or more televisions at home.

Mauritius 
The licence fee in Mauritius is Rs 1,800 per year (around €29), collected as part of the electricity bill. The fee provides 60% of the income for Mauritius Broadcasting Corporation (MBC). Most of the remaining funds come from television and radio commercials. The introduction of private broadcasting in 2002 has put pressure on MBC's commercial revenues. Private stations argue that MBC affects their profitability and they want the government to make MBC commercial-free.

Namibia 
The licence fee in Namibia was N$204 (about €23) in 2001. The fee is used to fund the Namibian Broadcasting Corporation.

South Africa 
The licence fee in South Africa is R265 (about €23) per annum (R312 per year if paid on a monthly basis) for television. A concessionary rate of R70 is available for those over 70, disabled persons and war veterans who are on social welfare. The licence fee partially funds the public broadcaster, the South African Broadcasting Corporation (SABC), providing R972 million (almost €90 million) in 2008–9. SABC derives much of its income from advertising. Proposals to abolish licensing have circulated since October 2009. The national carrier hopes to receive funding entirely from state subsidies and commercials.

Television licences in Asia

Japan 
In Japan, the annual licence fee (jushin-ryō, "receiving fee") for terrestrial television broadcasts is ¥14,205, and ¥24,740 for those receiving satellite broadcasts. The fee is slightly less if paid by direct debit. There is a separate licence for monochrome TV, and fees are slightly less in Okinawa. 

The Japanese licence fee pays for the national broadcaster, Nippon Hōsō Kyōkai (NHK).
Every household in Japan with a television set is required to have a licence, but in 2006 non-payment was described as "epidemic" following a series of scandals involving NHK. In 2005, it was reported that, "there is no fine or any other form of sanction for non-payment". The NHK Party, often called the Anti-NHK Party, was founded in 2013 as a single-issue political party to oppose the license fee, with its only policy being to encrypt NHK's broadcast signal, meaning only those who watch NHK pay for it.

Pakistan 
The television licence in Pakistan is Rs 420 per year, collected as monthly charge on all electricity bills. The fee plus advertising revenue fund the Pakistan Television Corporation (PTV).

South Korea 
In South Korea, the television licence fee is collected for the Korean Broadcasting System and the Educational Broadcasting System. The fee is ₩30,000 per year (about €20.67), and is bundled with electricity bills. It has stood at this level since 1981, and now makes up less than 40% of KBS's income and less than 8% of EBS's income. Its purpose is to maintain public broadcasting in South Korea, and give public broadcasters the resources to do their best to produce and broadcast public interest programs.

Countries where the TV licence has been abolished 

The following countries have had television licences, but subsequently abolished them:

Australia
Radio licence fees were introduced in Australia in the 1920s to fund privately owned broadcasters, which were not permitted to sell advertising. With the formation of the government-owned Australian Broadcasting Commission in 1932, licence fees were used to fund ABC broadcasts while privately-owned stations were permitted to seek revenue from advertising and sponsorship. Television licence fees were introduced in 1956 when the ABC began television transmissions. In 1964 a television licence, issued on a punched card, cost £6 (A$12); the fine for not having a licence was £100 (A$200).

All licence fees were abolished in 1974 by the Whitlam government on the basis that the near-universality of television and radio use meant that public funding was fairer. Since then, the ABC has been funded by government grants, now totalling around A$1.13 billion per year, plus its own commercial activities (merchandising, overseas sale of programmes, etc.).

Belgium

Flemish region and Brussels
The Flemish region of Belgium and Brussels abolished its television licence in 2001. The Flemish broadcaster VRT is now funded from general taxation.

Walloon region 
From 1 January 2018, the licence fee in the Walloon region (encompassing the French and German-speaking communities) was abolished. Licences in effect at that remained payable until their period was up but were not be renewed after that period.

The licence fee in Belgium's Walloon region was €100.00 for a television and €0.00 for a radio in a vehicle. One licence was needed per household with a functional television receiver, regardless of the number, but each car with a radio had to have a separate car radio licence. Household radios did not require a licence. The money raised by the fee was used to fund Belgium's French and German public broadcasters (RTBF and BRF respectively). The television licence fee was paid by people with surnames beginning with a letter between A and J between 1 April and 31 May inclusive, and those with surnames beginning with a letter between K and Z paid between 1 October and 30 November inclusive. People with certain disabilities were exempt from paying the fee. Hotels and similar lodging establishments paid an additional fee of €50.00 for each additional functional TV receiver and paid between 1 January and 1 March inclusive.

Bulgaria 
A fee for use of television and radio was included the fee in the Bulgarian Radio and Television Law passed in the 1990s. Following public criticism, the president vetoed the law. The Bulgarian National Assembly retained the power to impose a fee but added a temporary measure funding Bulgarian National Television (BNT) and Bulgarian National Radio (BNR) directly from the national budget. This funding mechanism has been retained since then.

Canada

The Radiotelegraph Act 1913 required anyone possessing a radio receiver to hold an "Amateur Experimental Station" licence, and pass an "Amateur Experimental Certificate of Proficiency", demonstrating the ability to send and receive Morse code at five words per minute. In January 1922 the government introduced a Private Receiving Station licence for people who only intended to receive radio, rather than transmit. The receiving station licences initially cost $1 per year. Over time this increased to $2.50 to cover radio and television broadcasts by the Canadian Broadcasting Corporation. The licence fee was abolished in 1953 and replaced with television equipment excise taxes.

Cyprus 
Cyprus had an indirect tax for CyBC, its state-run public broadcasting service, paid through electricity bills dependent on home size. It was abolished in the late 1990s and CyBC is now funded by advertising and government grants.

Denmark
Until 2022 a Danish media licence fee of 1353 kr (€182) per year was charged for any devices that could receive broadcast television. The majority of the licence fee funded the national radio and television broadcaster DR, with a smaller proportion funding TV 2's regional services. The media licence was abolished in 2022. Funding for DR is now provided through general taxation. TV 2 is now funded through advertising revenue, and it receives indirect subsidies through favourable loans from the Danish state.

Finland 
The television fee in Finland was between €244.90 and €253.80 per year for each household with television. It was the primary source of funding for Yleisradio (Yle). In 2013 it was replaced with the Yle public broadcasting tax, a progressive income tax up to €163 per person. People with low incomes, under the age of eighteen years, or resident in Åland are exempt from the tax.

France
Until 2022 a broadcasting licence fee funded Radio France and France Télévisions. People under the age of 21, under 25 and in full-time education, and those who had a household income below a certain threshold were exempt from the fee. The fee was abolished in 2022 and replaced with direct funding from the French Treasury.

Gibraltar
Until 2006 television licence fees provided funds to the Gibraltar Broadcasting Corporation (GBC). Even before the abolition of the licence fee, the majority of GBC's funding came as a grant from the government.

Hungary
In Hungary, licence fees nominally exist, but since 2002 residential fees have been paid from the state budget. This means that funding for Magyar Televízió and Duna TV comes directly from taxation. Commercial venues such as hotels and bars also had their fees paid between 2002 and 2007, but since then they have needed to make a payment per television set.

Ever since privatisation in 1995, the public broadcaster MTV has had persistent financial difficulties. During the 2009 financial crisis, parliament cut their funding by more than 30%, a move that was publicly condemned by the EBU.

Hong Kong
Hong Kong previously had a radio and television licence fee for Radio Television Hong Kong (RTHK) and Rediffusion Television, costing 36 Hong Kong dollars per year. RTHK is now funded by the Hong Kong Government.

Iceland
The television licence fee for Iceland's state broadcaster RÚV was abolished in 2007 and replaced with a poll tax of 17,200 kr. from everyone who pays income tax, regardless of whether they use television and radio.

India
India introduced a radio receiver licence system in 1928 for All India Radio (AIR) Akashvani. Television licensing began in 1956–57. In 1976, public television was separated from AIR as a separate company, Doordarshan. In the 1970s and 1980s,  radio licences cost Rs 15 per year and television licences cost Rs 50. The wireless licence inspector from the post office was authorized to check every house and shop for a Wireless License Book, and to issue penalties or seize the receiving equipment for non-payment. In 1984, the licensing system was withdrawn. AIR and Doordarshan are both funded by the Government of India and by income from advertising.

Indonesia
A radio tax for RRI funding was introduced in 1947, during the Indonesian National Revolution. The television fee was introduced soon after  TVRI started broadcasting in 1962. The radio tax was abolished in the 1980s. The television fee continued into the 1990s. Its abolition started after public protests about the company that collected the fee, which was run by the Indonesian President's son, but areas such as Bandung and Surabaya continued to have a television fee throughout the 1990s. A "broadcasting fee" was included in legislation in 2002 but has not been implemented. Public radio and television are currently funded through a combination of advertising and funds from the state budget.

Israel
Licence fees were the primary source of revenue for the Israel Broadcasting Authority when it was the state broadcaster. Every household was charged ₪ 345 (€73) for a television licence and car owners were charged ₪ 136 (€29) for a radio licence. The television licence was abolished in 2015, but a radio licence is still required of car owners. The Israel Broadcasting Authority was replaced by the Israeli Broadcasting Corporation in May 2017. Its radio stations carry advertising and some of its television programmes are sponsored by commercial entities.

Liechtenstein 
An annual licence was required between 1978 and 1998 for households with broadcast receiving equipment. The income was divided between PTT and the Swiss national broadcaster, SRG. Since 1998, an annual government grant for public media is administrated by the Mediakommision.

The sole radio station in the principality, Radio Liechtenstein, was founded as a private commercial music station in 1995. It was nationalised in 2004 under Liechtensteinischer Rundfunk to create a domestic public broadcasting station. It is funded by commercials and the public broadcasting grant.

Malaysia
Until April 2000, Malaysia had an annual television licence fee of MYR 24 (MYR 2 per month), one of the lowest television licence fees in the world. Now, RTM is funded by the government and advertising.

Malta
The licence fee in Malta funded Television Malta (TVM), and the radio stations Radio Malta and Radju Parliament run by Public Broadcasting Services. Approximately two-thirds of TVM's funding came from the licence fee, with much of the remainder coming from commercials. Malta's television licence was abolished in 2011 when the free-to-air system was discontinued.

Netherlands 
Advertising on public television and radio started in 1967 but was tightly regulated. Initially there was only a small advertising segment before and after news broadcasts. In the late 1980s, commercial breaks of 1 to 3 minutes were allowed between programmes. Advertising on Sundays was not permitted until 1991.
Due to excessive collection costs, the fee was abolished around 2000. Income tax was increased and the maximum duration  of commercial breaks was extended to 5 and 7 minutes. The Netherlands Public Broadcasting is now funded by government subsidy and advertising. The amount of time used by commercial breaks may not exceed 15% of daily broadcasting time or 10% of total annual broadcasting time.

New Zealand
Licence fees were first used in New Zealand to fund the radio services of what was to become the New Zealand Broadcasting Corporation. Television was introduced in 1960 and with it the television licence fee, later known as the public broadcasting fee. This was capped at NZ$100 a year in the 1970s, and the country's two television channels, while still publicly owned, became increasingly reliant on advertising. From 1989, it was collected and disbursed by the Broadcasting Commission (NZ On Air) on a contestable basis to support local content production. The public broadcasting fee was abolished in July 1999. NZ On Air was then funded by a direct appropriation from the Ministry for Culture and Heritage.

North Macedonia 
The licence fee in the Republic of North Macedonia was around €26 per year. Until 2005 it was collected monthly as part of the electricity bill. From November 2005, Macedonian Radio-Television (MRT) collected the fee until this responsibility was taken over by the Public Revenue Office. The fee was paid per household, with exemptions for households not covered by a broadcasting signal, and households of people with severe vision or hearing impairment. Hotels and motels were charged one broadcasting fee for every five rooms, legal persons and office space owners paid for one broadcasting fee for each 20 employees or other users of the office space, and owners of catering and other public facilities paid per television set. MRT also received income from advertising and sponsorship.

In January 2017, the licence fee was abolishe. MRT, Macedonian Broadcasting and the Agency for Audio and Audiovisual Media Services are now financed directly from the Budget of the Republic of North Macedonia.

Norway

The licence fee in Norway was abolished in January 2020. Before that, every household with a television needed to pay a fee of  3000 kr (c. €305). The fee was charged per household. People in a house who had a separate television and were not in the parental care of the householders needed to pay a separate licence fee. 
The fee was the primary source of income for Norsk Rikskringkasting (NRK). Since 2020, funding for NRK comes through taxation from each individual liable for income taxes in Norway.

Romania
Until 2017 a licence fee was collected as part of the electricity bill. It made up part of Televiziunea Română's (TVR) funding, with the rest coming from advertising and government grants. Everyone with a television receiver or a computer needed to pay.
In 2016, the Parliament of Romania decided to abolish the fee from 1 January 2017. Since then, TVR's funding mainly comes from government grants and advertising.

Singapore
Residents of Singapore with televisions in their households, or televisions or radios in their vehicles, were required to acquire the appropriate licences from 1963 to 2010. 
The licence fees were abolished from 1 January 2011. Finance Minister Tharman Shanmugaratnam reported that he was abolishing the fees as they were "losing their relevance".

Slovakia
The TV licence fee in Slovakia was €4.64 per month (€55.68 per year). In addition to the licence fee, RTVS also received state subsidies and money from advertising. The license fee was abolished from 1 July 2023.

Soviet Union 
Until 1961, all radio and television receivers in the Soviet Union were required to be registered in local telecommunication offices and a subscription fee was to be paid monthly. Compulsory registration and subscription fees were abolished on 18 August 1961, with prices of radio and television receivers raised to compensate for the lost fees.

Sweden 

The fee is administered by the Swedish Tax Agency, on behalf of the country's three public broadcasters Sveriges Television (SVT), Sveriges Radio (SR) and Sveriges Utbildningsradio (UR). The fee pays for 5 television channels, 45 radio channels, and online television and radio.

Previously the television licence was a household-based flat fee. Originally it was referred as the "television licence", but in the 2000s was renamed "television fee". It was payable in monthly, bimonthly, quarterly or annual instalments, to the agency Radiotjänst i Kiruna, which was jointly owned by SVT, SR and UR. The fee was collected by every household or company containing a television set, and possession of such a device had to be reported to Radiotjänst by law. One fee was collected per household regardless of the number of television sets in the home or at other locations owned by the household, such as summer houses. Although the fee also paid for radio broadcasting, there was no specific fee for radios since the radio licence was abolished in 1978. Television licence evasion was suspected to be around 11 to 15%.

Taiwan

Between 1959 and the 1970s, all radio and TV receivers in Taiwan were required to have a licence with an annual fee of NT$60. This was to prevent influence from mainland China's (the People's Republic of China) channels.

Countries that have never had a television or broadcasting licence

Andorra
Ràdio i Televisió d'Andorra, the public broadcaster, is funded by advertising and government grants with no fee for viewers.

Brazil
The federal company Empresa Brasil de Comunicação, which manages TV Brasil and public radio stations (Rádio MEC and Rádio Nacional), is financed from the Federal Budget, besides profit from licensing and production of programs, institutional advertisement, and service rendering to public and private institutions.

The Padre Anchieta Foundation, which manages TV Cultura and the Cultura FM and Cultura Brasil radio stations in São Paulo, receives funds from the state government, advertisements and fundraising from the private sector. In December 1997, a state "Education and Culture Tax" was introduced to pay for TV Cultura and Rádio Cultura, charged monthly through electricity bills according to consumers' energy consumption. However, the collection of the fee was declared unconstitutional by the Court of Justice of the State of São Paulo.

China
The current state broadcaster, China Central Television (CCTV), established in 1958, is funded almost entirely through the sale of commercial advertising time, although this is supplemented by government funding and a tax of ¥2 per month from all cable television subscribers in the country.

Estonia 
In Estonia there are three public TV channels: Eesti Televisioon ETV, ETV2, and ETV+ (ETV+ was launched on 27 September 2015 and mostly targets people who speak Russian). The funding comes from government grant-in-aid. ETV is currently one of only a few public television broadcasters in the European Union which has neither advertising nor a licence fee and is solely funded by national government grants. Commercials in public broadcasting television were stopped in 2002 over concerns that its low prices were damaging the ability of commercial broadcasters to operate. The introduction of a licence fee system was considered but ultimately rejected in the face of public opposition.

Iran 
Iran has never levied television licence fees. After the 1979 Islamic Revolution, National Iranian Radio and Television was renamed Islamic Republic of Iran Broadcasting, and became the state broadcaster. In Iran, private broadcasting is illegal.

Latvia 
Public Broadcasting of Latvia is a consortium of the public radio broadcaster Latvijas Radio and the public TV broadcaster Latvijas Televīzija, which operates the LTV1 and LTV7 channels. After years of debate, the public broadcasters ceased airing commercial advertising from January 1, 2021, and became fully government-funded by the national budget. The introduction of a television licence has been previously debated, but this was opposed by the government.

Luxembourg
Luxembourg has never had a television licence requirement. Until 1993, it had no national public broadcaster, and it still has no public television broadcaster. 

Radio 100,7 is a radio station funded by the country's Ministry of Culture and by sponsorship arrangements. Television in Luxembourg is provided by the commercial network RTL Télé Lëtzebuerg and channels serving nearby countries.

Monaco
Monaco has never had any listener or viewer broadcasting licence fee. Since the establishment of Radio Monte-Carlo in 1943 and Télévision Monte-Carlo in 1954, both have been funded on a commercial basis with no charge for the audience.

Nigeria
Television licences are not used in Nigeria, except in the sense of broadcasting licences granted to private networks. The federal government's television station, NTA (Nigerian Television Authority), has two broadcast networks: NTA 1 is partly funded by central government and partly by advertising revenue, and NTA 2 is wholly funded by advertisements. Almost all thirty-six states have their own television stations, funded wholly or substantially by their respective governments.

Philippines 
Television licensing has never been enacted in the Philippines. The state-owned television (PTV and IBC) and radio (PBS) stations have been funded directly by the government's annual budget.

Spain 
RTVE, the public broadcaster, had been funded by government grants and advertising income since it launched its radio services in 1937 and television services in 1956. Although the state-owned national radio station removed advertising in 1986, its TV channels continued broadcasting commercials until 2009. Since 2010, the public broadcaster is funded by government grants and taxes paid by private nationwide TV broadcasters and telecommunications companies.

United States 
In the United States, privately owned commercial radio and television stations funded by advertising proved to be commercially viable. Some governments owned non-commercial radio stations (such as WNYC, owned by New York City from 1922 to 1997) or educational television stations, but most broadcasters were private companies or were owned by charitable organizations supported by donations. 

The Corporation for Public Broadcasting (CPB) was created by the Public Broadcasting Act of 1967, and this led to the creation of the Public Broadcasting Service (PBS) and National Public Radio (NPR). These are loose networks of non-commercial educational (NCE) stations owned by state and local governments, educational institutions, and non-profit organizations. They are more similar to U.S. commercial networks than European public broadcasters. 

Annual funding for public television in the United States was US$445.5 million in 2014 (including interest revenue). The CPB, and virtually all government-owned stations, are funded through general taxes, donations from individuals (usually in the form of "memberships"), and charitable organizations. Individual programs on public broadcasters may be supported by underwriting spots paid for by sponsors. Between 53 and 60 percent of public television's revenues come from private membership donations and grants, so most stations solicit individual donations by fundraising, pledge drives or telethons which can disrupt regularly scheduled programming. Normal programming can be replaced with specials aimed at a wider audience to solicit new members and donations.

In some rural areas of the United States, broadcast translator districts exist, which are funded by an ad valorem property tax on all property within the district, or by a parcel tax on each dwelling unit within the district. Failure to pay the TV translator tax has the same repercussions as failing to pay any other property tax, including a lien placed on the property and eventual seizure. In addition, fines can be levied on viewers who watch TV from the translator signals without paying the fee. As the Federal Communications Commission has exclusive jurisdiction over broadcast stations, whether a local authority can legally impose a fee merely to watch an over-the-air broadcast station is questionable. In some areas the tax is charged regardless of whether the resident watches TV from the translator. In other areas the property owner may certify that they do not use the translator district's services and get a waiver.

Cable television franchise fee agreements are added to cable TV bills to fund public, educational, and government access (PEG) television for the municipality that granted the franchise agreement. State governments may also add taxes. These taxes generate controversy since they sometimes go into the general taxation fund, or there is "double taxation" where public-access television is paid for by taxes but the cable television operator has to pay for equipment or facilities, or has to pay for local municipality projects that are not related to television.

Uruguay 
Uruguay does not have a fee or TV licence. The two public broadcasters in the country, Canal 5 and RNU, are funded by government grants.

Vietnam 
Vietnam has never had a television licence fee. Advertising was introduced in the early 1990s as a way to generate revenue for television stations. The current state broadcaster, Vietnam Television, receives the majority of its funds through advertising and some from government subsidies. Local television stations in Vietnam are operated in a similar way.

Detection of television licence evasion 

In many jurisdictions, television licences are enforced. Detection of illegal television sets can be as simple as observing the lights and sounds of a television used in a property without a licence. 

Television detector vans have been employed by TV Licensing in the United Kingdom, with various detection techniques reported. 
An effort to compel the BBC to release key information about the television detection equipment under the Freedom of Information Act 2000 was rejected. The BBC stated, "Detection equipment is complex to deploy as its use is strictly governed by the Regulation of Investigatory Powers Act 2000 (RIPA) and the Regulation of Investigatory Powers (British Broadcasting Corporation) Order 2001. RIPA and the Order outline how relevant investigatory powers are to be used by the BBC and ensure compliance with human rights."
The BBC resisted further Freedom of Information Act requests seeking data on the estimated evasion rate for each of the nations of the UK.

Opinions of television licensing systems
Advocates argue that a main advantage of television fully funded by a licence fee is that programming can be enjoyed without interruptions for advertisements. Europeans tend to watch television for one hour less per day than North Americans, but because of differences in advertising may be enjoying the same amount of television content in that shorter time. 
Television funded by advertising is not truly free of cost to consumers as the cost of advertising is passed on in the price of products.

Critics of receiver licensing point out that a licence is a regressive form of taxation. In contrast, costs from advertising are paid proportion to the consumption of advertised goods. The experience with broadcast deregulation in Europe suggests that demand for commercial-free content is not as high as once thought.

In 2004, the UK government's Department for Culture, Media and Sport asked the public what it thought of various funding alternatives. Fifty-nine per cent of respondents agreed with the statement "Advertising would interfere with my enjoyment of programmes", while 31 per cent disagreed. 71 per cent agreed with the statement "subscription funding would be unfair to those that could not pay", while 16 per cent disagreed. An independent study showed that more than two-thirds of people polled thought that the licence fee should be dropped due to other subscription television services. The Department concluded that the licence fee was "the least worse  option", 
and in 2005 the British government described the licence fee system as "the best (and most widely supported) funding model, even though it is not perfect".

In 2018 there was a referendum in Switzerland on whether TV licensing should be scrapped, in which voters rejected abolition by 71.6% to 28.4%. Legislators in Bulgaria and Serbia have attempted to introduce a television licence. In Bulgaria, a fee is specified in the broadcasting law but has never been implemented. Lithuania and Latvia have debated the introduction of a licence fee but have not legislated for one. In the case of Latvia, some analysts believe this is partly because the government is unwilling to relinquish control of Latvijas Televīzija, which it gains from directly funding the service.

The Czech Republic increased the proportion of funding that the public broadcaster gets from licence fees, justifying the move with the argument that the existing public service broadcasters cannot compete with commercial broadcasters for advertising revenues.

Internet-based broadcast access 
The Internet allows television and radio programmes to be easily accessed outside their country of origin. Where national broadcasters have streaming services, there would be no technological difficulties in accessing these programmes internationally. However, countries with TV licensing systems often do not have a way for potential international viewers to pay for a licence. Instead, they work to prevent international access because licensing rules have not adapted to the possible global audience.

See also
 Broadcast licence
 City of license
 Public broadcasting
 Public radio
 Public television

References

External links

TV licensing authorities 
Broadcasting Fee Association – international organisation for television licence fee collecting organisations
 A list of TV licence authorities by the European Audiovisual Observatory
 Billag (Switzerland)
 Serafe (Switzerland)
  Licenskontoret  (Denmark)
 PEMRA (Pakistan)
 Beitragsservice (Germany)
 ORF-GIS (Austria)
 Radiotjänst (Sweden)
 TV Licences (South Africa)
 TV Licensing (United Kingdom)
 TV-maksuhallinto (Finland)

Licenses
Television terminology
Broadcast law
Tax